Buchanosteidae is a family of arthrodire placoderms that lived from the Early to Middle Devonian. Fossils appear in various strata in Russia, Central Asia, Australia, and China.

All buchanosteids tend to have flattened (of varying degrees depending on the genus) heads, with most genera also having large orbits.<ref name=Denison1>{{cite book|last=Denison|first=Robert|title=Placodermi Volume 2 of Handbook of Paleoichthyology'''|year=1978|publisher=Gustav Fischer Verlag|location=Stuttgart New York|isbn=978-0-89574-027-4|pages=69}}</ref>

Genera

Arenipiscis
From the Emsian of New South Wales, it is known from several scrappy remains.  It had a narrow skull, and the dermal surfaces of the bony armor were covered in a pattern of fine, granular tubercles.

Buchanosteus
The type genus, species are found in Emsian-aged strata in Australia, China, and Kazakhstan.

Errolosteus
One of several Taemas-Weejasper buchanosteid genera,  Errolosteus had a comparatively broad, short skull.

Exutaspis
A "giant" buchanosteid from Emsian-aged strata in China.  The holotype, an endocranium, was originally described as that of a phlyctaeniid.  The endocranium is several times larger than that of its sympatric relative, B. guangxiensis.

Burrinjucosteus
A large buchanosteid from the Taemas-Weejasper Reef of Emsian-aged New South Wales, its skull roof suggests the living animal was fairly broad and flat.

Parabuchanosteus
Another one of the Taemas-Weejasper Reef buchanosteids,  Parabuchanosteus was originally described as a species of Buchanosteus, but was then promoted to its own genus due to differences in anatomy.  The main difference between the two genera is that Parabuchanosteus has a somewhat shorter thoracic armor.

Goodradigbeeon
A flattened buchanosteid from the Emsian Taemas-Weejasper Reef, it shares anatomical similarities with homostiids.  Unlike the other Taemas-Weejasper buchanosteids, Goodradigbeeon'' is known from at least one mostly articulated specimen.

Narrominaspis
A small, large-eyed stem buchanosteid, it is known from Late Lochkovian-aged strata of the Connemarra Formation in Central New South Wales.

Taemasosteus
An "advanced" New South Wales buchanosteid, it has various anatomical features found in other arthrodire groups, such as coccosteids and homostiids, but not with other buchanosteids.

Toombstosteus
This genus is known from scrappy remains found in the Taemas-Weejasper Reef of Emsian New South Wales.

Uralosteus
This genus is found in two Emsian-aged deposits in the Ural Mountains in the Autonomous Republic of Bashkortostan, Russia.  The anatomy is similar, but distinct from other buchanosteids.  The dermal surface of the armor has a unique pattern of crowded ridging.

References